Arubans in the Netherlands consist of migrants from Aruba to the Netherlands and their descendants. Aruba was part of the former Netherlands Antilles until 1986 when the country seceded remaining a constituent country of Kingdom of the Netherlands. As of 2014, figures from Statistics Netherlands showed 142,953 people of Dutch Antillean origin in the Netherlands, of which 23,800 are Aruban. The largest Aruban communities in the Netherlands can be found in Amsterdam, Almere, Haarlem, The Hague, Rotterdam, Alkmaar and Amersfoort.

Notable people 
Emily Bolton, actress
Gregor Breinburg, football player
Alain Clark, singer
Denzel Dumfries, football player 
Caro Emerald, singer
Bobby Farrell, dancer, singer
Greg Halman, baseball player
Naomi Halman, basketball player
Percy Irausquin, fashion designer
Dwayne Kemp, baseball player
Hedwiges Maduro, football player
 Eugène Martineau, decathlete
 Pete Philly, rapper
 Danny Rombley, baseball player
 Edsilia Rombley, singer
 James Sharpe, politician
 Smiley, singer
 Demy de Zeeuw, football player

References 

Ethnic groups in the Netherlands
Netherlands